Time Served is a 1999 R-rated American prison film directed by Glen Pitre and starring Catherine Oxenberg, Jeff Fahey, Louise Fletcher, James Handy, and Bo Hopkins.

Foreign-language versions were produced in German (Ausgebeutet - Hölle hinter Gittern), in Spanish (Condenada sin ley), in Italian (Dietro le sbarre), and in Hungarian (Leszolgált idő).

Plot
Sarah McKinney (Catherine Oxenberg) is a nurse married to an abusive alcoholic. When he beats up both Sarah and their eight-year-old son Jason (Zach Gray), the boy uses his father's gun to shoot him dead. Sarah then claims to have pulled the trigger herself, and her attorney, Patrick Burlington (Jeff Fahey) warns her that she faces Judge William T. Engstrom III (James Handy), known as "Maximum Bill" for his long sentences. Convicted and sent to the Women's State Correctional Facility, she suffers lesbian assaults and Warden Mildred Reinecke (Louise Fletcher) bullies her into joining the work release program. This proves to be a strip club, where Sarah and the prisoners' services are enjoyed by none other than Judge Engstrom and his friends. Sarah sets out to blow the whistle, but being a helpless prisoner in the system has her at a disadvantage.

Cast
 Catherine Oxenberg as Sarah McKinney
 Jeff Fahey as Patrick Berlington
 Louise Fletcher as Warden Mildred Reinecke
 Bo Hopkins as Mr. D.
 James Handy as Judge William T. "Maximum Bill" Engstrom III
 Larry Manetti as Billy
 Lourdes Reynolds (Lourdes Colon) as Rosie Lopez
 Scott Schumacher as Duane
 Zach Gray as Jason McKinney
 Maureen Steindler as Lila
 Regina Prokop as Brenda
 Tyla Abercrumbie as Brenda's Cellmate
 Michael Landers as Bob
 Jack Bennett as Billy's Friend
 Jim Zulevic as Computer Hacker
 Shirl Toliver as Prison Nurse
 Greg Hollimon as FBI Agent 
 Veronica Armstrong as Dancer
 Holly Biniak as Dancer
 Eileen Flahtely as Dancer
 Michele Jeans as Dancer
 Debora Joseph as Dancer
 Jennifer Malanado as Dancer
 Savy Run as Dancer
 Carrie White as Dancer
 Dawn Zilnsky as Dancer

Production
The picture was filmed in the summer of 1998 in Chicago, Berwyn, and Melrose Park, all in Illinois.

It was R-rated for adult situations, language, nudity, and violence. VideoHound called it a "typically sleazy women-in-prison movie".

Notes

External links

1999 films
Films directed by Glen Pitre
Films scored by Joe Delia
American prison films
1990s prison films
1990s English-language films
1990s American films